Kanash (Kanaş) is a rural locality (a village) in Slakbashevsky Selsoviet, Belebeyevsky District, Bashkortostan, Russia. The population was 44 as of 2010. There is 1 street.

Geography 
Kanash is located 36 km southeast of Belebey (the district's administrative centre) by road. Krasnoyar is the nearest rural locality.

References 

Rural localities in Belebeyevsky District